Patersonia juncea, commonly known as rush leaved patersonia, is a species of plant in the iris family Iridaceae and is endemic to a restricted part of the south-west of Western Australia. It is a tufted perennial herb with linear leaves and pale violet tepals.

Description
Flowering mainly occurs from August to October.

Taxonomy and naming
Patersonia juncea was first described in 1840 by John Lindley in A Sketch of the Vegetation of the Swan River Colony. The specific epithet (juncea) means "rush-like".

Distribution and habitat
Rush leaved patersonia grows in forest, woodland mallee and scrub between Eneabba and Israelite Bay in the Avon Wheatbelt, Esperance Plains, Geraldton Sandplains, Jarrah Forest, Mallee, Swan Coastal Plain and Warren.

Conservation status
Patersonia juncea is classified as "not threatened" by the Western Australian Government Department of Biodiversity, Conservation and Attractions.

References

juncea
Flora of Western Australia
Plants described in 1840
Taxa named by John Lindley